Talnakhite is a mineral of chalcopyrite group with formula: Cu9(Fe, Ni)8S16. It was named after the Talnakh ore deposit, near Norilsk in Western Siberia, Russia where it was discovered as reported in 1963 by I. Budko and E. Kulagov. It was officially named "talnakhite" in 1968. Despite the initial announcement it turned out to be not a face centered high-temperature polymorph of chalcopyrite, but to have composition Cu18(Fe, Ni)18S32. At  to  it decomposes to tetragonal cubanite plus bornite.

References

Copper(I,II) minerals
Sulfide minerals
Iron minerals
Nickel minerals
Cubic minerals
Minerals in space group 217